Ottestad is a village in Stange Municipality in Innlandet county, Norway. The whole northern part of Stange, surrounding the village centre, is often referred to as Ottestad as well. Ottestad Church is located in the village.

Historically, the families who lived on the Ottestad farm took that farm name as their surname. The name is a protected surname in Norway seeing that fewer than 200 people have it. In 2021, there were 197 people living in Norway with Ottestad as their surname.

References

Stange
Villages in Innlandet